Dipoena is a genus of tangle-web spiders that was first described by Tamerlan Thorell in 1869.

Species
 it contains 162 species, found in Asia, Central America, North America, Africa, the Caribbean, Europe, South America, on Vanuatu, and in Australia:

D. abdita Gertsch & Mulaik, 1936 – USA, Mexico, Caribbean
D. aculeata (Hickman, 1951) – Australia (Tasmania)
D. adunca Tso, Zhu & Zhang, 2005 – Taiwan
D. ahenea (Dyal, 1935) – Pakistan
D. anahuas Levi, 1963 – Mexico
D. anas Levi, 1963 – Panama, Colombia
D. appalachia Levi, 1953 – USA, Canada
D. arborea Zhang & Zhang, 2011 – China
D. atlantica Chickering, 1943 – Panama to Paraguay
D. augara Levi, 1963 – Venezuela, Brazil
D. austera Simon, 1908 – Australia (Western Australia)
D. banksi Chickering, 1943 – Costa Rica to Venezuela
D. bellingeri Levi, 1963 – Jamaica
D. beni Levi, 1963 – Bolivia
D. bernardino Levi, 1963 – USA
D. bifida Zhang & Zhang, 2011 – China
D. bimini Levi, 1963 – Bahama Is., Cuba
D. bodjensis (Simon, 1885) – Indonesia (Bodjo Is.)
D. bonitensis Rodrigues, 2013 – Brazil
D. boquete Levi, 1963 – Panama
D. braccata (C. L. Koch, 1841) – Europe, Mediterranean, Caucasus
D. bristowei Caporiacco, 1949 – Kenya
D. bryantae Chickering, 1943 – Panama, Trinidad, Brazil
D. buccalis Keyserling, 1886 – North America
D. calvata Gao & Li, 2014 – China
D. cartagena Sedgwick, 1973 – Chile
D. cathedralis Levi, 1953 – China, USA
D. chathami Levi, 1953 – USA
D. chickeringi Levi, 1953 – Panama
D. chillana Levi, 1963 – Chile
D. cidae Rodrigues, 2013 – Brazil
D. complexa Gao & Li, 2014 – China
D. cordiformis Keyserling, 1886 – Costa Rica to Brazil
D. cornuta Chickering, 1943 – Nicaragua to Bolivia
D. croatica (Chyzer, 1894) – Eastern Europe
D. crocea (O. Pickard-Cambridge, 1896) – Guatemala
D. destricta Simon, 1903 – Sierra Leone
D. dominicana Wunderlich, 1986 – Hispaniola
D. dorsata Muma, 1944 – USA to Paraguay
D. duodecimpunctata Chickering, 1943 – Panama, Venezuela, Brazil
D. eatoni Chickering, 1943 – Mexico, Panama
D. ericae Rodrigues, 2013 – Brazil
D. erythropus (Simon, 1881) – Europe
D. esra Levi, 1963 – Peru, Brazil
D. flavomaculata (Keyserling, 1891) – Brazil
D. foliata Keyserling, 1886 – Brazil
D. fornicata Thorell, 1895 – Myanmar
D. fortunata Levi, 1953 – Mexico
D. fozdoiguacuensis Rodrigues, 2013 – Brazil
D. galilaea Levy & Amitai, 1981 – Greece, Israel
D. glomerabilis Simon, 1909 – Vietnam
D. grammata Simon, 1903 – Gabon
D. granulata (Keyserling, 1886) – Brazil, Argentina
D. guaraquecaba Rodrigues, 2013 – Brazil
D. gui Zhu, 1998 – China
D. hasra Roberts, 1983 – Seychelles (Aldabra)
D. hortoni Chickering, 1943 – Panama to Brazil
D. hui Zhu, 1998 – China
D. insulana Chickering, 1943 – Mexico to Panama
D. ira Levi, 1963 – Brazil
D. isthmia Chickering, 1943 – Panama, Brazil
D. josephus Levi, 1953 – Costa Rica, Panama
D. keumunensis Paik, 1996 – Korea
D. keyserlingi Levi, 1963 – Brazil
D. kuyuwini Levi, 1963 – Venezuela, Guyana, Brazil, Bolivia
D. lana Levi, 1953 – USA, Panama
D. latifrons Denis, 1951 – France, Spain (Balearic Is.)?
D. lesnei Simon, 1899 – Algeria
D. leveillei (Simon, 1885) – Algeria, Tunisia
D. liguanea Levi, 1963 – Jamaica
D. lindholmi (Strand, 1910) – Ukraine
D. linzhiensis Hu, 2001 – China
D. longiducta Zhang & Zhang, 2011 – China
D. longiventris (Simon, 1905) – Argentina
D. lugens (O. Pickard-Cambridge, 1909) – Britain, Spain
D. luisi Levi, 1953 – Mexico
D. malkini Levi, 1953 – USA
D. meckeli Simon, 1898 – St. Vincent
D. melanogaster (C. L. Koch, 1837) (type) – Europe, North Africa to Azerbaijan, Iran
D. membranula Zhang & Zhang, 2011 – China
D. mendoza Levi, 1967 – Brazil, Argentina
D. mertoni Levi, 1963 – Panama
D. militaris Chickering, 1943 – Panama to Paraguay
D. mitifica Simon, 1899 – Indonesia (Sumatra)
D. mollis (Simon, 1903) – Equatorial Guinea
D. neotoma Levi, 1953 – USA
D. nigra (Emerton, 1882) – USA, Canada, Mexico
D. nigroreticulata (Simon, 1880) – Europe to Azerbaijan
D. nipponica Yoshida, 2002 – China, Japan
D. niteroi Levi, 1963 – Brazil
D. notata Dyal, 1935 – Pakistan
D. obscura Keyserling, 1891 – Brazil
D. ocosingo Levi, 1953 – Mexico
D. ohigginsi Levi, 1963 – Chile
D. olivenca Levi, 1963 – Brazil
D. opana Levi, 1963 – Brazil
D. origanata Levi, 1953 – Mexico
D. orvillei Chickering, 1943 – Panama
D. pacifica Chickering, 1943 – Panama, Jamaica
D. pacificana Berland, 1938 – Vanuatu
D. pallisteri Levi, 1963 – Peru
D. parki Chickering, 1943 – Panama
D. pelorosa Zhu, 1998 – China, Japan
D. peregregia Simon, 1909 – Vietnam
D. perimenta Levi, 1963 – Panama
D. peruensis Levi, 1963 – Peru, Brazil, Paraguay
D. petrunkevitchi Roewer, 1942 – Myanmar
D. picta (Thorell, 1890) – Indonesia (Sumatra)
D. plaumanni Levi, 1963 – Brazil
D. polita (Mello-Leitão, 1947) – Brazil
D. praecelsa Simon, 1914 – France
D. pristea Roberts, 1983 – Seychelles (Aldabra)
D. proterva Chickering, 1943 – Panama
D. provalis Levi, 1953 – USA
D. puertoricensis Levi, 1963 – Puerto Rico, Brazil
D. pulicaria (Thorell, 1890) – Indonesia (Sumatra)
D. pumicata (Keyserling, 1886) – Brazil, Argentina
D. punctisparsa Yaginuma, 1967 – Korea, Japan
D. pusilla (Keyserling, 1886) – Brazil
D. quadricuspis Caporiacco, 1949 – Kenya
D. redunca Zhu, 1998 – China
D. ripa Zhu, 1998 – China
D. rita Levi, 1953 – USA
D. rubella (Keyserling, 1884) – Panama to Peru, Brazil
D. santacatarinae Levi, 1963 – Brazil
D. santaritadopassaquatrensis Rodrigues, 2013 – Brazil
D. scabella Simon, 1903 – Equatorial Guinea
D. seclusa Chickering, 1948 – Panama to Venezuela
D. sedilloti (Simon, 1885) – France, Algeria, Tunisia
D. semicana Simon, 1909 – Vietnam
D. seminigra Simon, 1909 – Vietnam
D. sericata (Simon, 1880) – France
D. sertata (Simon, 1895) – Sri Lanka
D. setosa (Hickman, 1951) – Australia (Tasmania)
D. shortiducta Zhang & Zhang, 2011 – China
D. signifera Simon, 1909 – Vietnam
D. silvicola Miller, 1970 – Angola
D. standleyi Levi, 1963 – Panama
D. subflavida Thorell, 1895 – Myanmar
D. submustelina Zhu, 1998 – China
D. sulfurica Levi, 1953 – USA, Mexico
D. taeniatipes Keyserling, 1891 – Brazil
D. tecoja Levi, 1953 – Mexico
D. tingo Levi, 1963 – Peru, Brazil
D. tiro Levi, 1963 – Venezuela, Brazil
D. torva (Thorell, 1875) – Europe, Russia (Europe to South Siberia), Kazakhstan
D. transversisulcata Strand, 1908 – Madagascar
D. trinidensis Levi, 1963 – Trinidad, Brazil
D. tropica Chickering, 1943 – Panama, Colombia
D. tuldokguhitanea Barrion & Litsinger, 1995 – Philippines
D. turriceps (Schenkel, 1936) – China, Laos
D. umbratilis (Simon, 1873) – Western Mediterranean
D. variabilis (Keyserling, 1886) – Brazil
D. venusta Chickering, 1948 – Panama
D. wangi Zhu, 1998 – China, Korea
D. washougalia Levi, 1953 – USA
D. waspucensis Levi, 1963 – Nicaragua
D. woytkowskii Levi, 1963 – Venezuela, Peru
D. xanthopus Simon, 1914 – Algeria
D. yutian Hu & Wu, 1989 – China
D. zeteki Chickering, 1943 – Panama
D. zhangi Yin, 2012 – China

In synonymy:
D. barro Levi, 1963 = Dipoena anas Levi, 1963
D. copiosa Levi, 1953 = Dipoena cordiformis Keyserling, 1886
D. crassiventris Keyserling, 1886 = Dipoena nigra (Emerton, 1882)
D. inca Levi, 1963 = Dipoena tingo Levi, 1963
D. inornata (Chamberlin & Ivie, 1944, T from Euryopis) = Dipoena abdita Gertsch & Mulaik, 1936
D. itu Levi, 1963 = Dipoena taeniatipes Keyserling, 1891
D. maculata Keyserling, 1891 = Dipoena pumicata (Keyserling, 1886)
D. matagrossensis Soares & Camargo, 1948 = Dipoena militaris Chickering, 1943
D. parvula Banks, 1901 = Dipoena nigra (Emerton, 1882)
D. procax (Simon, 1879) = Dipoena torva (Thorell, 1875)
D. roeweri Chickering, 1951 = Dipoena rubella (Keyserling, 1884)
D. schmidti Levi, 1963 = Dipoena banksi Chickering, 1943
D. sicki Levi, 1963 (T from Dipoenata) = Dipoena variabilis (Keyserling, 1886)
D. tibialis Banks, 1906 = Dipoena nigra (Emerton, 1882)

See also
 List of Theridiidae species

References

Araneomorphae genera
Cosmopolitan spiders
Taxa named by Tamerlan Thorell
Theridiidae